Manchester Rugby Club, founded in 1860 as Manchester Football Club, is one of the oldest rugby union clubs in the world. Home matches are played at Grove Park in Cheadle Hulme, Stockport.

The club has a Senior Men's section (1st XV, 2nd XV and 3rd XV), a Senior Women and Youth Girls section (Manchester Women & Girls' Academy), and also Minis, Juniors and Colts (Manchester Academy). The club's home colours are red and white narrow hooped shirts, white shorts and red and white hooped socks. Away colours are navy shirts with red piping, navy shorts and navy socks.  The men's 1st XV currently play in Regional 1 North West, the fifth tier of the English rugby union system. The Women's 1st XV compete in Championship North 2, in the third tier of the English rugby union system.

History
Although officially founded in 1860 as Manchester Football Club, a Manchester team actually first played in 1857, when the Gentlemen of Manchester and the Gentlemen of Liverpool came together to play a friendly game. Richard Sykes, a former Captain of Football at Rugby School set up the Manchester team and provided the ball. The game was advertised as "Rugby versus the World" and some fifty players arrived to play. There is no record of the score, however it appears that five tries were scored and so there must have been a winner.

Liverpool FC, who later merged with St Helens RUFC to form Liverpool St. Helens F.C, came into being not long afterwards. It is not known why Manchester did not also form at this date but the Liverpool and St Helens clubs' merger in 1986 left Manchester as one of the oldest rugby clubs in the world.

From 1919 until 1968 the club's home ground was at Moor Lane on Kersal Moor, now the home of Salford City F.C.
 
Manchester had very strong links with the early RFU, with two former presidents of MFC also taking the same office as President of the RFU (James MacLaren 1882-1884 and Roger Walker) 1894–1896. Other members who have been President of the RFU are J.W.H.Thorpe (1898-1900), James Milnes (1934), J.Reg.Locker (1967) and Dr.T.A.Kemp, MD, FRCP (1971). The club has provided a number of international players since 1871. The club provided four England players in the world's first ever international match against Scotland in 1871 (Richard Osborne, William MacLaren, Arthur Sumner Gibson and H.J.C. Turner). Another former player was Albert Neilson Hornby, the first ever player to captain England at both rugby and cricket. The earliest international jersey is still on display in the clubhouse. Andrew Bulteel and Ernest Marriott both played for England in the last 20 a-side match against Ireland in 1875. 

Manchester FC were also the first recognised association football side in Manchester.  In 1894 Newton Heath (present day Manchester United) were banned from changing their name to Manchester FC by the FA and RFU because of the existence of the rugby side. The full story of Manchester FC's association football history is detailed in Manchester A Football History where it is revealed they hold many Mancunian firsts.  They were also the first English club side to play football competitively in Scotland when they faced Queen's Park F.C. in the second round of the FA Cup in 1883–84, losing 15–0.

Manchester Women's Rugby
Manchester Women's Rugby was founded at Manchester Rugby Club in 1991 in the year of the first ever Women's Rugby World Cup. The club has gone from strength to strength, rising through the leagues to compete in Championship North 2 in the third tier of the RFU English Rugby Union system. The club has established a Women & Girls' Academy section, offering development and competitive rugby to U13, U15, U18 and Senior Women. Manchester Rubies and Manchester Women front the clubs' competitive squads.

Honours
1st XV:
Glengarth Sevens Davenport Plate winners: 1974
North West 2 champions: 1989–90
North West 1 champions: 1991–92
North Division 2 champions: 1992–93
North Division 1 champions: 1995–96
Lancashire Cup winners (3): 1998, 1999, 2001
South Lancs/Cheshire 1 2016–17
North 2 West champions: 2019–20

2nd XV:
South Lancs/Cheshire 4 champions: 2002–03
South Lancs/Cheshire 3 champions: 2003–04
Halbro North West Division 2 South champions: 2022-23

Current standings
2022-23 North West 1
2022-23 Women's Championship North 2

Members who have been President of the RFU
James Maclaren 1882-84
Roger Walker 1894-96
J. W. H. Thorpe 1898-1900
James Milnes 1934
J. Reg. Locker 1967
Dr. T. A. Kemp, MD, FRCP 1971

International players

Opponent: E - England S - Scotland I - Ireland W - Wales NZ - New Zealand F - France A - Australia

  H.J.C. Turner S 1871
  Arthur Sumner Gibson S 1871
  William MacLaren S 1871
  Richard Osborne S 1871
  James Genth S 1874/75
  Roger Walker S 1874/76/79/80 I 1875
  W. H. Hunt S 1876/77 I 1876/78
  Andrew Bulteel I 1876
  Ernest Marriott I 1876
  D. Drew E 1871/1876
  W. Gregg S 1876 I 1876
  R. Todd S 1877
  T. Blatherwick I 1878
  Albert Neilson Hornby S 1877/78/81/82 I 1877/78/80/81/82
  F. D. Fowler S 1878/79
  W. E. Openshaw I 1879
  J. Heron E 1879 S 1877
  Hugh Rowley S 1879/80/81/82 I 1879/80/81/82 W 1881
  W. R. Richardson I 1881
  J. W. Schofield I 1880
  R. Hunt S 1881 I 1880/82 W 1881
  J. T. Hunt S 1881 I 1882/84
  Charles Allen E 1884 S 1884
  F. T. Wright S 1881
  J. H. Payne S 1882/83 I 1883/84/85 W 1883/85
  C. Anderton NZ 1889
  F. A. Leslie Jones IW 1895
  D. C. Woods S NZ 1889
  J. E. Orr E 1890/91/92/93 I 1889/90/91/92/93 W 1890/91/92
  E. F. Fookes S 1896/97/99 I 1896/97/98/99 W 1896/97/98
  C. J. Fleming E 1896 I 1896/97
  A. O. Dowson S 1899
  H. Rottenburg E 1899/1900 W 1899/1900 I 1897
  Capt. E. I. M. Barrett S 1903
  Leonard Haigh S 1910/11 I 1910/11 W 1910/11 F 1911
  F. G. Handford SIWF 1909
  C. S. Williams F 1910
  Dr.T. Smyth E 1908/09/10/11/12 W 1908/09/10/11 S 1908/09/10/11 F 1910
  J. A. Schofield W 1911
  W. J. Cullen E 1920
  G. S. Conway S 1920/22/23/24 I 1920/22/23/24 W 1922/23/24/27 F 1920/21/22/23/24 NZ 1925
  R. S. Simpson I 1922
  A. L. Gracie I 1921/22/23 E 1921/22/23 W 1921/22/23 F 1921/22/23/24
  B. S. Chantill WESF 1924
  Dr. A. C. Gillies E 1924/25/27 I 1924/27 W 1924/25/26/27 F 1925/26/27
  P. H. Davies I 1927
  G. S. Wilson WI 1929
  Dr. T. A. Kemp W 1937/47 I 1937 S 1938 A 1947
  T. F. Huskinson S 1936/38 W 1936/37/38 I 1936/37/38
  A. H. Drummond WI 1938
  R. S. L. Carr WIS 1939
  C. B. Holmes S 1947 I 1948 F 1948/1955
  H. Scott F 1955
  Fr. J. M. Cunningham E 1955 F 1955/56 S 1955/56 W 1955/56
  A. B. W. Risman W 1959/61 I 1959/61 S 1959/61 F 1959/61 A 1961
  N. J. Drake-Lee W 1963/64/65 I 1963/64 S 1963 F 1963 NZ 1964
  D. W. A. Rosser W 1965/6 ISF 1965
  B. J. O’Driscoll FESW 1971
  J. O’Driscoll S 1978/80/81/82/83 A 1979 E 1980/81/82/83 F 1980/81/82/83 W 1980/81/82/83
  M. Moylett E 1988

Captains of Manchester Football Club
Senior Men:

 1860/67 R. Sykes
 1868 William MacLaren
 1869/70 W. Grave
 1871 J. McLaren
 1872/79 Roger Walker
 1880/81 Albert Neilson Hornby
 1882 J. W. Schofield
 1883 E. Storey
 1884 J. E. Fletcher
 1885/87 J. D. Wormaid
 1888 F. A. Andrew
 1889/90 A. H. Molesworth
 1891/92 G. N. M. Cameron
 1893 D. C. Woods
 1894 W. B. Steel
 1895 K. P. Birley
 1896 W. Parlane
 1897 W. G. Hogg
 1898 W. Parlane
 1899 T. A. Kingscote
 1900 G. Cookson
 1901/03 F. J. Milne
 1904 J. Milnes
 1905 V. P. Gamon
 1906 F. I. Dixon
 1907/08 J. Hunter
 1909 H. Whitehead
 1910 L. Haigh
 1911 H. E. Latham
 1912 J. Tolson
 1913 T. Entwisle, J. C. Barrett
 1919 G. Folds
 1920 W. Sutcliffe
 1921 G. Folds
 1922 W. M. Hoyle
 1923 H. S. Jones
 1924 D. Peak
 1925/27 A. L. Gracie
 1928/29 Dr. A. C. Gillies
 1930 L. J. O’Reilly
 1931 H. C. S. Jones
 1932 F. Hughes
 1933/35 T. A. Bell
 1936 J. M. Lee
 1937/38 T. A. Bell
 1939 J. M. Lee
 1945 G. W. Singleton
 1946/48 A. G. Komrower
 1949/50 P. G. Clemence
 1951/53 A. Ferguson
 1954/55 P. T. Baines
 1956 D. Stewart
 1957 J. E. Cooper
 1958 P. Batten
 1959 G. D. Parker, H. Scott
 1960/62 K. Jones
 1963 G. St. J. L. Goddard
 1964 P. D. G. Ross
 1965/66 Dr. J. B. O’Driscoll
 1967 M. Wright
 1968 E. A. Wright
 1969 W. J. Chadwick
 1970 D. A. Hancock
 1971 R. J. K. Newitt
 1972 N. P. G. Ross
 1973/74 C. R. Unsworth
 1975 J. R. Gadd
 1976 J. Wharton
 1977 P. Jarvie
 1978 G. Hughes, L. Sampson
 1979 L. Sampson
 1980 C. Hanson
 1981 S. Bell
 1982 S. Burnage
 1983 D. Cotter
 1984 G. Stewart
 1985 S. Litster, G. Birch
 1986 G. Birch
 1987 R. Smith
 1988/94 D. A. Kelly
 1995 A. S. Hanson
 1996 N. Hitchen, S. Swindells
 1997/98 S. Swindells
 1998/2000 S. Swindells
 2000 G. Gerrard
 2001/02 D. Mukalt
 2002/03 A. Aylesbrook
 2003 M. Armstrong
 2004 M. Armstrong
 2005 J. Bramhall
 2006 J. Bramhall
 2007 J. Bramhall
 2008 N. Flynn
 2009 J. Doney, D. Carlton
 2010 D. Carlton
 2011 D. Carlton
 2012 R. McCartney
 2013 R. McCartney
 2014 T. Fantom
 2015 B. Jenkins
 2016 K. Higginson

Senior Women:

 1991 M. Waugh
 1993 J. Hawkins
 1994 S. Shotton
 1995 J. Deakin
 2007 J. Canner-Farrington
 2008 A. Wood
 2011 L. Dudbridge & R. Sallaway
 2012 H. Gaunt & J. Taylor-Reid
 2013 R. Prescott & V. Calder
 2014 K. Bailey
 2015 A. Smith
 2016 S. Hobday
 2017 H. Gaunt & K. Barker
 2018 E. Gallimore & K. Bailey
 2019 J. Pugh
 2020 J. Wells
 2022 E. Houghton

Notes

References

External links
 Official website
 Official Twitter
 Manchester Women's Rugby

Rugby clubs established in 1860
English rugby union teams
Sport in Stockport
1860 establishments in England
Sport in the City of Salford